John Bainbridge may refer to:

 John Bainbridge (footballer) (1880–1960), English footballer
 John Bainbridge (astronomer) (1582–1643), English astronomer
 John Bainbridge (author) (born 1953), British author and countryside campaigner
 John Bainbridge (Royal Navy officer) (1845–1901), Irish cricketer and Royal Navy officer
 John Lakin Bainbridge (1913—1992), The New Yorker staff writer